Judy Barrett Litoff (December 23, 1944 – July 3, 2022) was an American editor and author, best known for her editorial work on books on American women's history. A graduate of the University of Maine, she has been professor of history at Bryant University since 1975.

References 

1944 births
2022 deaths
American editors
American historians
American women editors
Women's historians
20th-century American women writers
21st-century American women writers